Colaspidea globosa is a species of beetle in the Chrysomelidae family that can be found in France, Spain, on the island of Sicily, and North Africa.

References

Eumolpinae
Beetles described in 1848
Beetles of North Africa
Beetles of Europe